Plagodis serinaria, the lemon plagodis, is a species of geometrid moth in the family Geometridae. It is found in North America.

The MONA or Hodges number for Plagodis serinaria is 6840.

References

Further reading

External links

Ennominae
Articles created by Qbugbot
Moths described in 1855